was a  after Jōan and before Jishō. This period spanned the years from July 1175 through August 1177.

Change of era
 1175 : The new era name was created to mark an event or series of events. The previous era ended and a new one commenced in Jōan 5, on the 28th day of the 7th month of 1175.

Events of the Angen era
 1175 (Angen 1, 22nd day of the 2nd month): the naidaijin Minamoto no Masamichi died at age 58.
 1175 (Angen 1, 11th month): Fujiwara no Moronaga was named naidaijin.
 1176 (Angen 2, 3rd month): Emperor Takakura visited his father, former-Emperor Go-Shirakawa, on the occasion of his 50th birthday.
 1176 (Angen 2, 19th day of the 7th month): The former-Emperor Rokujō died at the age of 13; and also in this same month, Takakura's mother, Empress Kenshun-mon In (formerly Taira Sigeko) died.
 1176 (Angen 2, 7th month): Fujiwara no Morotaka, daimyō of Kaga, was in a dispute with the priests of Mt. Hiei; and his younger brother, Fujiwara no Morotsune, set fire to some of the temple buildings. The priests complained to the emperor, demanding that Morotaka be exiled and the Morotsune should be put in prison. However, because Fujiwara no Seiko, the father of these two brothers, was a great friend of Go-Shirakawa, the affair was allowed to lie dormant.
 May 27, 1177 (Angen 3, 28th day, 4th month): A fire burned the university structure to ashes.

Notes

References
 Brown, Delmer M. and Ichirō Ishida, eds. (1979).  Gukanshō: The Future and the Past. Berkeley: University of California Press. ;  OCLC 251325323
 Nussbaum, Louis-Frédéric and Käthe Roth. (2005).  Japan encyclopedia. Cambridge: Harvard University Press. ;  OCLC 58053128
 Titsingh, Isaac. (1834). Nihon Odai Ichiran; ou,  Annales des empereurs du Japon.  Paris: Royal Asiatic Society, Oriental Translation Fund of Great Britain and Ireland. OCLC 5850691
 Varley, H. Paul. (1980). A Chronicle of Gods and Sovereigns: Jinnō Shōtōki of Kitabatake Chikafusa. New York: Columbia University Press. ;  OCLC 6042764

External links
 National Diet Library, "The Japanese Calendar" -- historical overview plus illustrative images from library's collection

Japanese eras
1170s in Japan